Sentimental Education (released in the United Kingdom as Lessons in Love) is a 1962 drama film directed by Alexandre Astruc. The story focuses on a student who has an affair with a married middle-class woman whose husband cheats on her with a model. The film is loosely based on the 1869 novel of the same name by Gustave Flaubert. The screenplay was written by Roger Nimier with dialogue by Roland Laudenbach and Alain Astruc.

Cast
 Jean-Claude Brialy as Frédéric Moreau
 Marie-José Nat as Anne Arnoux
 Dawn Addams as Catherine Dambreuse
 Michel Auclair as Didier Arnoux
  as Barbara
 Pierre Dudan as Charles Dambreuse

References

External links
 
 
 

1962 films
1962 drama films
Films based on works by Gustave Flaubert
Films based on French novels
Films directed by Alexandre Astruc
Films with screenplays by Roland Laudenbach
French drama films
1960s French-language films
Films with screenplays by Roger Nimier
1960s French films